The 1982 Grand Prix de Tennis de Toulouse was a men's tennis tournament played on indoor Carpet courts in Toulouse, France that was part of the Grand Prix series of the 1982 Grand Prix tennis circuit. It was the first edition of the tournament and was held from 6 December until 12 December 1982. First-seeded Yannick Noah won the singles title.

Finals

Singles

 Yannick Noah defeated  Tomáš Šmíd, 6–3, 6–2

Doubles

 Pavel Složil /  Tomáš Šmíd defeated  Jean-Louis Haillet /  Yannick Noah, 6–4, 6–4

References

External links
 ITF tournament edition details

Grand Prix de Tennis de Toulouse
Grand Prix de Tennis de Toulouse
Grand Prix de Tennis de Toulouse
Grand Prix de Tennis de Toulouse